The following people were bishops, prince-bishops or archbishops of Freising or Munich and Freising in Bavaria:

Bishops of Freising 

 St. Corbinian (724–730); founded the Benedictine abbey in Freising, although the diocese was not organized until 739)

 Establishment of episcopal organisation in Old Bavaria by Saint Boniface in 739.

 Erembert (739–747/748; sometimes referred to as Corbinian's half brother)
 Joseph of Freising, also known as Joseph of Verona (747/748–764)
 Arbeo (764–783/784)
 Atto (783/784–810/811)
 Hitto (810/811–834/835)
 Erchanbert (835/836–854)
 Anno (854/855–875)
 Arnold (875–883)
 Waldo (883/884–903/906)
 Utto (904/906–907)
 Dracholf (907–926)
 Wolfram (926–937)
 St. Lantpert (937/938–957)
 Abraham (956/957–993/994)
 Gottschalk of Hagenau (994–1005)
 Egilbert of Moosburg (1005–1039)
 Nitker (1039–1052)
 Ellenhard, Count of Meran (1052–1078)
 Meginward, Count of Scheyarn (1078–1098)
 Henry I of Freising, also known as Henry I of Ebersdorf (1098–1137)
 Otto I (1137–1158)
 Albert I of Harthausen (1158–1184)
 Otto II (1184–1220)
 Gerold of Waldeck (1220–1230)
 Conrad I of Tölz and Hohenburg (1230–1258)
 Conrad II Wildgraf of Dhaun (1258–1278/1279)
 Frederick of Montalban (1279–1282)

 Elevation to a Hochstift i.e. Prince-Bishopric  in 1294

Prince-bishops of Freising 

 Waldgrave Emicho (1282–1311)
 Gottfried of Hexenagger (1311–1314)
 Conrad III the Sendlinger (1314–1322)
 John I Wulfing (1323–1324)
 Conrad IV of Klingenberg (1324–1340)
 John II Hake (1340–1349)
 Albert II of Hohenberg (1349–1359)
 Paul of Jägerndorf (1359–1377)
 Leopold of Sturmberg (1377–1381)
 Berthold of Wehingen (1381–1410)
 Conrad V of Hebenstreit (1411–1412)
 Hermann of Cilli (1412–1421)
 Nicodemus of Scala (1421/1422–1443)
 Henry II of Schlick (1443–1448)
 John III Grünwald (elected 15 Jan 1448; died 2 Dec 1452)
 John IV Tulbeck (elected Jan 1453; resigned Nov 1473)
 Sixtus of Tannberg (elected 12 Jan 1473; died 14 Jul 1495)
 Ruprecht of the Palatinate (elected 1 Aug 1495; resigned 3 Dec 1498)
 Philip of the Palatinate (elected 1498; died 5 Jan 1541)
 Henry II of the Palatinate (succeeded 5 Jan 1541; died 3 Jan 1552)
 Leo Lösch of Hilkertshausen (elected 15 Feb 1552; died 8Apr 1559)
 Moritz of Sandizell (elected 12 Jun 1559; died 18 Oct 1566)
 Ernest of Bavaria (elected 18 Oct 1566; died 17 Feb 1612)
 Stephen of Seiboldsdorf (elected May 1612; died 16 Jan 1618)
 Veit Adam of Gepeckh von Arnsbach (elected 12 Feb 1618; died 8 Dec 1651)
 Albert Sigismund of Bavaria (1651/1652–1685)
 Joseph Clemens of Bavaria (succeeded 4 Nov 1685; resigned 29 Sep 1694)
 John Francis Eckher of Kapfing and Liechteneck (elected 29 Jan 1694/1695; died 23 Feb 1727)
 Cardinal John Theodore, Duke of Bavaria (succeeded 23 Feb 1727; died 27 Jan 1763)
 Clemens Wenceslaus, Duke of Saxony (elected 18 Apr 1763; resigned 20 Aug 1768)
 Louis Joseph Freiherr of Welden on Laupheim and Hohenaltingen (electected 23 Jan 1768; died 15 Mar 1788)
 Maximilian Prokop of Toerring-Jettenbach elected 26 May 1788; died 30 Dec 1789)
 Joseph Conrad Freiherr of Schroffenberg, C.R.S.A. (elected 1 Mar 1790; died 4 Apr 1803). After his death, the temporal authority of the bishop was mediatised and abolished by the Elector of Bavaria.

 Sede vacante as a result of the secularisation under Napoleonic rule (1803–1821)

 Joseph James of Heckenstaller, priest, vicar capitular (appointed 14 Apr 1803); was also named first a vicar general and, later, a papal delegate as "vicar capitular apostolic", but never raised to the episcopacy; resigned 16 Feb 1818. The episcopal functions were exercised by auxiliary bishop, Johann Nepomuk Wolf.

 Elevation to an archdiocese in 1817/1821

Archbishops of Munich and Freising 

Lothar Anselm Freiherr von Gebsattel (appointed 16 February 1818; confirmed soon, but at first only apostolic administrator; archbishop 1 November 1821; died 1 October 1846) 
Karl August Cardinal Graf von Reisach (succeeded 1 October 1846; cardinal 17 December 1855; resigned 19 June 1856) 
Gregor (Leonhard Andreas) von Scherr, O.S.B. (appointed 6 January 1856; died 24 October 1877)
Antonius von Steichele (appointed 30 April 1878; died 9 October 1889) 
Antonius von Thoma (appointed 23 October 1889; died 24 November 1897)
Franz Joseph von Stein (appointed 24 December 1897; died 4 May 1909) 
Franziskus Cardinal von Bettinger (appointed 23 May 1909; cardinal 25 May 1914; died 12 April 1917) 
Michael Cardinal von Faulhaber (appointed 26 May 1917; cardinal 7 March 1921; died 12 June 1952) 
Joseph Cardinal Wendel (appointed 9 August 1952; cardinal 12 January 1953; died 31 December 1960) 
Julius August Cardinal Döpfner (appointed 3 July 1961, already a cardinal; died 24 July 1976) 
Joseph Cardinal Ratzinger (appointed 24 March 1977; cardinal 27 June 1977; resigned 15 February 1982), subsequently Pope Benedict XVI
Friedrich Cardinal Wetter (appointed 28 October 1982; cardinal 25 May 1985; retired 2 February 2007) 
Reinhard Cardinal Marx (appointed 30 November 2007; cardinal 20 November 2010)

See also 
Archdiocese of Munich and Freising

References

Sources 
 Alois Weissthanner (ed.): Die Regesten der Bischöfe von Freising. Vol. I: 739–1184. Continued and completed by Gertrud Thoma and Martin Ott (= registers of Bavarian history), C.H.Beck. Munich, 2009, . (Recension)

External links 

 

 Erzbistum Munchen and Freising, Erzbischofe